The Trulock-Gould-Mullis House is a historic house at 704 West Barraque Street in Pine Bluff, Arkansas.  It is a -story wood-frame structure, a gabled roof with a large cross gable, and clapboard siding.  The cross gable is set over the main entrance, which is sheltered by a porch extending across the front facade.  The gable has set in it three narrow round-arch windows, in a Palladian style where the outer windows are slightly smaller.  The cornice line is decorated with bargeboard. The house was built in 1876 for Marshall Trulock, and is locally distinctive for its unusual Gothic features.

The house was listed on the National Register of Historic Places in 1978.

See also

National Register of Historic Places listings in Jefferson County, Arkansas

References

Gothic Revival architecture in Arkansas
Houses completed in 1876
Houses in Pine Bluff, Arkansas
Houses on the National Register of Historic Places in Arkansas
National Register of Historic Places in Pine Bluff, Arkansas